Guimet is a surname used by French and Spanish families. Uses of the name include:

People
 Jean-Baptiste Guimet (1795–1871), French industrial chemist
 Émile Étienne Guimet (1836–1918), French industrialist, son of the above
 Felip Comabella i Guimet (1841–1901), Spanish pharmacist
 Jordi Guimet (born 1948), Spanish industrial engineer
 , a Peruvian female taekwondo practitioner

Other uses
 The Guimet Museum, founded by Émile Étienne Guimet.
 The former Museum of Natural History - Guimet in Lyon. In 2014, its collections were transferred to the Musée des Confluences
 Émile Guimet Prize for Asian Literature, annual French literary prize first awarded in 2017

Surnames of French origin
Surnames of Spanish origin